Songs of a Circling Spirit is an album by Canadian musician Tom Cochrane released in 1997 (see 1997 in music). The album contains newly recorded acoustic versions of selected songs written by Cochrane, and previously recorded either by Cochrane or Red Rider.

Track listing

Personnel
 Tom Cochrane - guitar, vocals, mixing
 Gregor Beresford - drums, djembe
 Bill Bell	   - guitar, mandolin, background vocals
 Tara Maclean - background vocals
 John Webster  - mixing
 Bob Ludwig	   - mastering
 Ed Krautner	   - engineering and mixing
 John Rummen	   - art direction and design
 Crystal Heald	   - design
 Andrew MacNaughtan - photography
 Justin Zivojinovich - photography

References

1997 compilation albums
Tom Cochrane albums
Capitol Records compilation albums